Mariana Rondón (born 1966 in Barquisimeto, Lara state) is a Venezuelan cinema director, screenwriter, producer and visual artist. She studied at Escuela Internacional de Cine y Televisión (San Antonio de los Baños International School), in Cuba, and later animation in France. In 1990 she created the Andean Multinational Company “Sudaca Films” together with other Latin American film makers.

Cinematography 
Among her works are Calle 22 (Street 22), a short film which won an award at the Biarritz Festival in 1994 and A la media noche y media (At Midnight and a Half) in 1999.

In 2007 she directed and produced Postales de Leningrado (Postcards From Leningrad), an autobiographical film (her parents were members of the Venezuelan guerrilla movement Fuerzas Armadas de Liberación Nacional (FALN)) which was awarded the “Abrazo” Prize at the Latin American Cinema and Culture festival in Biarritz.

In 2013 she released her new film Pelo Malo (Bad Hair), which went on to win the Golden Shell award at the 61st San Sebastian Film Festival.

References

External links
Filmmaker's website

1966 births
Living people
Venezuelan women film directors